Reader is a census-designated place (CDP) in Wetzel County, West Virginia, United States. As of the 2010 census, its population was 397.

Reader got its start circa 1901 when the railroad was extended to that point. The community took its name from nearby Reader Run creek.

References

Census-designated places in West Virginia
Census-designated places in Wetzel County, West Virginia